Delian League is a metal band from New Jersey. In 2005 they released their album titled Truth in Chaos.

The members of Delian League are:
Jude Andrade – Vocals
Shane Boulos – Bass
Richard Broadhead – Guitar
David Hatfield – Guitar
Joe Dooling – Drums

References

External links
Billboard.com
Delian League MySpace

Heavy metal musical groups from New Jersey